Moshe "Chiko" Tamir (born 1964) is an Israeli brigadier general who commanded the Gaza Division of the Israel Defense Forces.

Military service
Tamir was drafted into the IDF in 1982 and did his military service in the Golani Brigade, of which he became commander in 2001–2003. He served as a soldier, a squad leader in the brigade's 12th Battalion.

In 1984 he became an infantry officer after finishing the officer candidates' school, and returned to the Golani Brigade. Tamir led the Brigade's reconnaissance company, the 12th Battalion and Egoz Unit in counter-guerrilla operations in South Lebanon. For his actions as the commander of Egoz Unit, Tamir received the Head of Regional Command (Aluf) Citation. Afterwards he commanded a regional brigade in South Lebanon. Tamir commanded the Golani Brigade during the Second Intifada, including during Operation Defensive Shield. Later on he commanded the Gaza Division.

Tamir was forced to resign from the IDF because of an incident in which he tried to cover up an accident involving his young son joyriding in a military all-terrain vehicle. He was court-martialed and subsequently honorably discharged.

References

1964 births
Israeli generals
Living people
Israeli Jews
Israeli military personnel